Malaya Inya (Kiçü İyin) is a rural locality (a selo) in Minusinsky District, the Altai Republic, Russia. The population was 181 as of 2016. There are 3 streets.

Geography 
Malaya Inya is located 73 km southeast of Onguday (the district's administrative centre) by road. Inya is the nearest rural locality.

References 

Rural localities in Ongudaysky District